Satin and Spurs is a 1954 American TV variety special with Betty Hutton. This was the first NBC special broadcast in color. The special originated from NBC's color studios in the Midwood section of Brooklyn. NBC would produce later specials from here, including Peter Pan with Mary Martin.

Cast
Betty Hutton as Cindy
Guy Raymond as Tex
Josh Wheeler as Dick
Edwin Philips as Ollie
Kevin McCarthy as Tony
Neva Patterson as Ursula
Steve Allen made a special post-credits appearance to give a brief tour of the NBC Brooklyn studio and promote an upcoming special.

Production
The budget was $300,000.

References

External links
Satin and Spur at IMDb
Satin and Spurs at TCMDB

1954 films
1954 television films
American television films